The MacKinnon Apartments are a historic apartment building at 236 Third Street in Juneau, Alaska. The building is a three-story wood-frame structure, finished in stucco; it has corner quoining and a dentillated cornice. In 1959  was added; the extension houses five more studio units. The building is representative of Juneau's boom years in the 1920s which was the peak of the Gold Rush.

The building was listed on the National Register of Historic Places in 2000.

See also
National Register of Historic Places listings in Juneau, Alaska

References

Residential buildings on the National Register of Historic Places in Alaska
Residential buildings completed in 1925
Buildings and structures in Juneau, Alaska
Buildings and structures on the National Register of Historic Places in Juneau, Alaska
Apartment buildings in Alaska